Rokometno društvo Prule 67, commonly referred to as RD Prule 67 or simply Prule 67, was a handball club from Ljubljana, Slovenia. Due to financial problems, the club was dissolved in 2005. They have won the Slovenian First League of Handball once, in the 2001–02 season.

Club honours

Domestic

Winners of the Slovenian First League and Slovenian Cup in the 2001–02 season

European record

1999–2000 EHF Cup Winners' Cup  – Semi-finals
2000–01 EHF Cup Winners' Cup  – Quarter-finals
2001–02 EHF Cup – Round 3
2002–03 EHF Champions League – Semi-finals
2003–04 EHF Champions League – Round of 16

References

External links
Eurohandball.com profile

Slovenian handball clubs
Sports clubs in Ljubljana
Handball clubs established in 1967
Sports clubs disestablished in 2005
1967 establishments in Slovenia